Kevin Kern (born Kevin Lark Gibbs on December 22, 1958) is an American pianist, composer and recording artist of new-age music. He was born in Detroit, Michigan. He is now generally recognized as a representative of the new-age style. Born legally blind, Kern is aided in studio by SONAR's accessibility and Dancing Dots’ assistive music technologies for the vision impaired.

Biography
Kevin was found playing "Silent Night" on the piano at 18 months of age. He started learning the piano regularly at 4 and began writing music at 8. At 14, he put on performances with the music group he founded called "The Well-Tempered Clavichord". Despite his legal blindness since birth, he was still determined to be a pianist.

His first performance in Asia was in Taiwan, in 2002.

He has released ten albums, including a compilation album, and two songbooks. He also has released a Japan-only CD and songbook, as well as another album only in Asia.

His first world tour show in 2016.  Japan, Taiwan were become his lucky places.

Personal life
Kevin Kern is married to Pamela Gibbs, a former cardiac transplant nurse and product manager for several medical device companies. According to the liner notes of his album, Embracing the Wind, the couple were married in June 2001 on the island of Maui, Hawaii, in a private ceremony with friends and family present. The song "From This Day Forward" from the same CD was written for and dedicated to her. She has been mentioned in his album credits several times, including playing the rainstick on "Through the Veil" on The Winding Path and catering several recording sessions. After living for several years in San Francisco, they moved to Minneapolis, MN in 2007.

Discography

Studio albums 
 1996 — In the Enchanted Garden
 1997 — Beyond the Sundial
 1998 — Summer Daydreams
 1999 — In My Life
 2001 — Embracing the Wind
 2003 — The Winding Path
 2005 — Imagination's Light
 2009 — Endless Blue Sky
 2012 — Enchanted Piano
 2012 — Christmas
 2016 — When I Remember

Compilation albums 
 2002 — More Than Words: The Best of Kevin Kern
 2014 — Always Near - A Romantic Collection

Other album appearances 
 1997 — Eternity: A Romantic Collection
 1997 — Tranquility
 1997 — Piano Dreamers
 2002 — Sacred Spa Music Series
 2005 — Real Piano
 2006 — InSparation
 2009 — Sacred Spa Music Series 2

Songbooks
 2001  — Kevin Kern Piano Album Songbook
 2002  — Through Your Eyes: Kevin Kern Collection Songbook (Japan Only)
 2006  — In the Enchanted Garden Songbook
 2008  — Imagination's Light Songbook

Kevin Kern has also released a total of 62 individual solo piano sheet music arrangements to date that are available on MusicNotes.com.

See also 
List of ambient music artists

External links
Kevin Kern Official Website
Kevin Kern Official Facebook Page
Kevin Kern Official Twitter Page
Kevin Kern Official YouTube Channel
 Kevin Kern at Real Music Label
Kevin Kern at AllMusic

Male pianists
American male composers
20th-century American composers
Composers for piano
New-age pianists
Musicians from Michigan
1958 births
Living people
Blind musicians
20th-century American pianists
American male pianists
21st-century American pianists
20th-century American male musicians
21st-century American male musicians